Yrjö Aleksanteri Murto (24 August 1899 – 17 December 1963) was a Finnish communist politician and trade unionist.

Born to a working-class family, Murto became a saw mill worker, and joined both the Finnish Woodworkers' Union and the Finnish Communist Party (SKP).  In 1927, he became president of the union, and in 1930 he briefly served as president of the Finnish Trade Union Federation, to which the union was affiliated.  The federation and its affiliates were banned, and Murto moved to the Soviet Union to study at the Lenin School.

Murto returned to Finland in 1935, intending to resume political activity, but he was arrested and imprisoned for seven years.  On completing his sentence, he was immediately sent to an internment camp, and was finally released in 1944.

Murto was appointed as the SKP's organising secretary for Oulu.  In 1945, he entered government as the Deputy Minister of Transport and Public Works, with responsibility for communications, moving in 1946 to become the Deputy Minister of Public Services, with responsibility for social services.  The SKP left the government in 1948, Murto being elected as vice-president of the party.  He also won a seat in Parliament, and served there for the remainder of his life.  From 1949 until 1952, he additionally served as the general secretary of the Trade Union International of Building, Wood, Building Materials and Allied Industries.

References

1899 births
1963 deaths
Communist Party of Finland politicians
Finnish trade union leaders
Government ministers of Finland
International Lenin School alumni
Members of the Parliament of Finland (1948–51)
Members of the Parliament of Finland (1951–54)
Members of the Parliament of Finland (1954–58) 
Members of the Parliament of Finland (1958–62)
Members of the Parliament of Finland (1962–66)
Finnish expatriates in the Soviet Union